Kurtziella antiochroa is a species of sea snail, a marine gastropod mollusk in the family Mangeliidae.

Description
The length of the shell varies between 6 mm and 10 mm, its diameter is 3 mm.

Distribution
This marine species occurs between Panama and Ecuador

References

 Pilsbry, Henry Augustus, and Herbert N. Lowe. "West Mexican and Central American mollusks collected by HN Lowe, 1929-31." Proceedings of the Academy of Natural Sciences of Philadelphia (1932): 33–144.

External links
  Tucker, J.K. 2004 Catalog of recent and fossil turrids (Mollusca: Gastropoda). Zootaxa 682:1–1295.
 
 MNHN, Paris : Kurtziella antiochroa

antiochroa
Gastropods described in 1932